Pyhra is a town with 3286 inhabitants in the district of Sankt Pölten-Land in Lower Austria, Austria.

Geography

Pyhra is located in the hill country of the Mostviertel in Lower Austria, near the city St. Pölten. The biggest mountain is the Amerlingkogel (628 m).

The area is 66.73 square kilometers big. 40.04 per cent of the area is wooded.

Districts 
Districts are Adeldorf, Aigen, Atzling, Auern, Baumgarten, Blindorf, Brunn, Ebersreith, Egelsee, Fahra, Gattring-Raking, Getzersdorf, Heuberg, Hinterholz, Hummelberg bei Hinterholz, Kirchweg, Nützling, Oberburbach, Obergrub, Oberloitzenberg, Obertiefenbach, Perersdorf, Perschenegg, Pyhra, Reichenhag, Reichgrüben, Schauching, Schnabling, Steinbach, Unterburbach, Unterloitzenberg, Wald, Weinzettl, Wieden, Windhag, Zell and Zuleithen.

Neighbour municipalities

Pyhra borders Böheimkirchen in the northeast, 
Kasten by Böheimkirchen and Michelbach in the east, 
St. Veit on the Gölsen in the south, 
Wilhelmsburg in the southwest, and 
St. Pölten in the west and northwest.

Schools 
 
NÖ Landeskindergarten, 
Volksschule Pyhra,
Europa-Hauptschule Pyhra, 
Landwirtschaftliche Fachschule Pyhra and the 
music school of the Perschlingtal.

References

Cities and towns in St. Pölten-Land District